The Traitress (German: Die Verräterin) is a 1911 German silent drama film directed by Urban Gad and starring Asta Nielsen, Max Obal and Robert Valberg.

It was shot at the Babelsberg Studios in Berlin.

Cast
 Asta Nielsen as Yvonne 
 Max Obal as Marquis de Bougival 
 Robert Valberg as Lieutenant von Mallwitz 
 Emil Albes as Vujrat, leader of the partisans

References

Bibliography
 Bock, Hans-Michael & Bergfelder, Tim. The Concise CineGraph. Encyclopedia of German Cinema. Berghahn Books, 2009.

External links

1911 films
Films directed by Urban Gad
German silent feature films
Films of the German Empire
German black-and-white films
Franco-Prussian War films
Films shot at Babelsberg Studios
1910s German films